Antoni Jach (born 8 May 1956) is an Australian novelist, painter and playwright. His most recent novel is Napoleon's Double, a narrative enlisting history and philosophy for its own neo-baroque ends. His previous novels are The Weekly Card Game, a tragicomic study of quotidian repetition and The Layers of the City, a meditation on contemporary Paris, civilisation and barbarism (which was shortlisted for The Age Book of the Year Fiction Award and was translated into Turkish under the title Sehrin Katmanlari).

Antoni is also the author of a book of poetry, An Erratic History, an idiosyncratic history of Australia and two plays, Miss Furr and Miss Skeene and Waiting for Isabella. He is the creator of a series of artist videos and his paintings have been on display in an exhibition at Le Globo in Paris. He is the publisher at Modern Writing Press, is as an editorial adviser at the literary journal, Heat, holds a PhD from the University of Melbourne and has a painting featured on the cover of Antipodes, the literary journal of the American Association for Australian Literary Studies

Biography
Jach was born in Melbourne to a Polish father Wladyslaw Jach (the author of a book of poetry Most Human Beings are Dreamers and of a memoir Walk in a Wind) and Australian mother, Margaret Taylor. Margaret was descended on her mother's side from the Clancys of Castletownroche in Ireland and her forebears on her mother's side arrived in Melbourne on 4 November 1841. It is claimed that Margaret's grandfather, Thomas Gerald Clancy, was the basis for Banjo Paterson's poems 'Clancy of the Overflow' and 'The Man from Snowy River'. Wladyslaw's father was the mayor of the village of Skronina and Wladyslaw, according to his memoir, spent most of World War II in a Nazi concentration camp.

Antoni's first unpublished novel Dina Club was shortlisted for The Australian/Vogel Literary Award in 1990. He completed a BA in English & Art History at La Trobe University. He began teaching at RMIT in 1986 where he taught until 2011. He is married to the novelist Sallie Muirden, with whom he has two children.

His novels are modernist in style with 'a gift for entering a story from an unexpected angle and for taking an original approach' His interest in Europe, particularly France and its intellectuals, has inspired Napoleon's Double and his exploration of Paris in The Layers of the City. He has interviewed many writers including, most recently, the art-historian and poet TJ Clark

Teaching
Antoni taught at RMIT's professional writing and editing diploma course, one of the most highly regarded creative writing courses on offer in Australia. He taught in the course from 1988 to 2010 and believes the students are people who have existing or potential writing talent. Stephen Grimwade, current Melbourne Writers Festival Director and ex-student of Antoni's sums up many students' feelings when he explains that Antoni changed his life. Stephen has also been quoted as saying that Antoni was "open to students' ideas rather than just telling us what to think".

Writing
The Weekly Card Game is a tour de force. Trying to entertain using the subject of boredom is a risky challenge few writers would dare take up in an increasingly market-oriented publishing industry. The comic effect is mainly achieved through a terse but very stylish prose sprinkled with deadpan humour, the action being revealed through the eyes of a self-effacing focaliser.

Napoleon's Double is an intellectual treat of an unusual kind, at once indulgent, slow-moving, engrossing. It is seen as the high point of Jach's career. The two most striking extended passages in the book emulate the kind of probing by naive inquiry found in the work of Jean-Antoine's hero, Voltaire. Three of the companions are sent as spies to the Egyptian town of El Arish. Posing as Italian surgeons, their ostensible mission is to cure a reclusive prince of an undiagnosed illness: "He wishes to escape the intertwined ropes of melancholy and lethargy." The discussion about how he can be "cured of life itself" is virtuosic. The self-proclaimed servants of knowledge and "the empirical world" will still find that mesmerism and magnetism do the trick.

Bibliography

Fiction
 Dina Club unpublished (1989)
 The Weekly Card  McPhee Gribble (1994) 
 The Layers of the City Hodder Headline (1999) 
 Napoleon's Double Giramondo Publishing (2007)

Poetry
 An Erratic History Brunswick Hills Press (1988)

Plays
 Miss Furr and Miss Skeene (2006)
 Waiting For Isabella (Act One) (2010)

References

External links
 Heroic Inspiration – a profile of Jach
 Curtis Brown profile
 Austlit profile
 A review of Napoleon's Double on ABC Radio National The Book Show

1956 births
Living people
20th-century Australian novelists
21st-century Australian novelists
Australian male novelists
Australian poets
Australian people of Polish descent
Writers from Melbourne
Australian male poets
20th-century Australian male writers
21st-century Australian male writers